The Mammoth Unified School District is a public school district in Mono County, California. It oversees public education in the southwestern part of the county, including the communities of:
Crowley Lake
Mammoth Lakes

The district office is at Mammoth Lakes.

References

External links
 

School districts in Mono County, California